Perry Fitzpatrick is an English actor. He is known for his roles as DS Chris Lomax in the BBC series Line of Duty, Flip in This Is England '86 and This Is England '90, and Hot & Cold in Drifters.

Early life 
Fitzpatrick attended the Central Junior Television Workshop when he was 11. Whilst there, Fitzpatrick befriended Vicky McClure, with whom he later worked on This Is England '86, This Is England '90, I Am Nicola and the sixth series of Line of Duty.

Career
In 2022, Fitzpatrick featured in crime drama Sherwood, alongside Lesley Manville and David Morrissey, and Hullraisers. In December 2022, Fitzpatrick once again starred alongside McClure, playing the latter's ex husband in the ITV psychological thriller, Without Sin.

Filmography

References 

1982 births
English actors
Living people